CGCOC Group Co., Ltd. formerly known as CGC Overseas Construction Group Co., Ltd. is a Chinese construction company that ranks among the 100 largest contractors based on international projects according to the annual Engineering News Record ranking.

History
In 2002 other investors were introduced in the incorporation of CGC Overseas Construction Group Co., Ltd., which CGC Nigeria became part of the business group.

Shareholders
As at 31 December 2015, Sinopec Star Petroleum owned 40.7% stake, China Geo-Engineering Corporation owned 13.333% stake, Shanxi Bureau of Geology Exploration owned 4.375% stake, 13th Construction Co., Ltd. of China National Chemical Engineering Co., Ltd. owned 1.04% stake, as well as many natural person.

Construction projects
The company carries out projects across Africa and in other markets.  In Cameroon, the company signed a deal in December 2007 to increase water production and distribution in Douala from 115,00 to 260,000 cubic meters in a year by constructing pipe networks, wells and a potable water treatment plant.

One of the company's substantial businesses in Africa is road building in Ethiopia. In the period from 2005 to 2006, the company was awarded about $276 million in Ethiopian road projects.  These projects included the Dodola Junction-Goba and Dera-Gololcha Mechara roads located in Oromia.

References

External links

 

Construction and civil engineering companies of China
Government-owned companies of China
Sinopec
Chinese companies established in 1983
Chinese companies established in 2002
Construction and civil engineering companies established in 1983
Construction and civil engineering companies established in 2002